HOT-7, or 2,5-dimethoxy-4-(β-propylthio)-N-hydroxyphenethylamine, is a psychedelic phenethylamine of the 2C family.  It was presumably first synthesized by Alexander Shulgin and reported in his book, PiHKAL.

Chemistry

HOT-7's full chemical name is 2-[4-(2-propylthio)-2,5-dimethoxyphenyl–N–hydroxyethanamine.  It has structural properties similar to 2C-T-7 and to other drugs in the HOT- series, with the most closely related compounds being HOT-2 and HOT-17.

General information

The dosage range of HOT-7 is typically 15-25 mg and its duration is approximately 6–8 hours according to Shulgin.  HOT-7 produces closed-eye and open-eye visuals.  It also induces a feeling similar to that of being drunk.

Legality

United Kingdom
This substance is a Class A drug in the Drugs controlled by the UK Misuse of Drugs Act.

See also
Phenethylamine

References

Psychedelic phenethylamines
Thioethers
Hydroxylamines